The International Tree of Peace (Slovak: Strom pokoja, Russian: Дерево мира, German: Der Friedensbaum) is an international initiative that originated in Slovakia. The project, created on the occasion of the 100th anniversary of the end of World War I, was initiated by landscape architect Marek Sobola from Žilina, Slovakia. The main goal of the project is to promote a message of peace by planting a Tree of Peace on every continent. The project is claimed to aim at planting trees around the globe to draw awareness to the global environmental issue and to enhance the solidarity of the humankind. The initiative, with the support of the Ministry of Foreign and European Affairs of the Slovak Republic, is implemented by Slovak NGO Servare et Manere which has a Special Consultative Status within the Economic and Social Council of the United Nations (UN ECOSOC). The project's motto is "Let's make love the lifeblood of this world".

The World Map of Peace also World Peace Map, abbreviated to the Map of Peace, unites all individual Trees of Peace plantings into one global whole.

Background 
World War I had an impact on Sobola's family. His great-grandfather Ondrej Sobola (Andreas Szobola) died on the Russian battlefield. Ondrej was born on August 7, 1880, in the village of Lalinok near Žilina (then Lalinek, Kingdom of Hungary). He was enlisted in the 15th Military Infantry Regiment and went missing in 1915. Ondrej died in an unknown place. He was officially pronounced dead in 1930, with an official date of death: December 31, 1918. The story of the author's family inspired him to memorialize the soldiers who died in WWI in unknown places without their names or identities. This international project Tree of Peace officially represents the Slovak Republic under the brand called “GOOD IDEA SLOVAKIA – IDEAS FROM SLOVAKIA”. The Trademark License is granted by the Ministry of Foreign and European Affairs of the Slovak Republic.

The World Map of Peace was created to unify the individual plantings of the Trees of Peace in different countries of the world and give them a clear goal: to involve as many countries as possible into the planting of Trees of Peace and thus gradually supplement the Map of Peace. The World Map of Peace was created symbolically on Earth Day, April 22, 2021 in Slovakia by a symbolic planting of a coniferous tree in Carl Gustav Swensson Park in Žilina.

The International Tree of Peace was founded in 2018 in Slovakia and its main goal is the promoting a message of peace through the planting of at least one Tree of Peace on every continent. The project was originally associated with the centenary of the end of the First World War. It has since evolved to having a more general focus of promoting ideas of peace and friendship amongst nations and spreading an ecological message through the planting of trees as a symbol of peace and remembrance with a respect to nature. The project is increasingly focused on sustainable development, one of the guarantees of sustainable peace. The tree planting as a symbol of growth and development points not only to the futility of military conflicts, but also to the senseless plundering of nature in all its spheres – on land, in the oceans or air pollution. Because also wars and riots bring great environmental burdens and destroy human destinies.

At the time of its creation there were 10 countries on the World Map of Peace: Uzbekistan, Liechtenstein, Slovakia, the United Kingdom, Germany, Serbia, United States, Russia (by 2022), Poland and Austria.

Although the bearer of the idea of the Map of Peace, NGO Servare et Manere is a strictly apolitical organization, it has strongly condemned the 2022 Russian invasion of Ukraine. Servare et Manere honours the ideas of peace and understanding between nations.

Symbol 
The symbol of the Map of Peace is an evergreen tree, in botany also known as an evergreen plant (Latin binomial term sempervirens), thus such a plant which has foliage (needles) that remains green and functional through more than one growing season. This contrasts with deciduous plants, which completely lose their foliage during the winter or dry season. The evergreen plant has great connection and symbolism with a sustainable peace, which should not alternately “fall” and then “sprout” again like some deciduous trees, but should be as stable and continuous as evergreen plants thus always and still present.

Present and future 

Project has the ambition to be a universal message of joining the nations. Nowadays this project is not strictly linked to 1918 and the WWI, but rather generally to the need for peace and avoidance of global military conflicts. In this way, the project is universal and its application is made available to countries which were touched by WWI only marginally. But the author does not exclude the allusion to this global military conflict because thanks to it the project itself began. This project is European, international and strictly apolitical. The main idea of the project is a Message of Peace. In 2018 and 2021, the ideas of the Tree of Peace were also implemented in the Russian Federation. Although the Tree of Peace initiative is a strictly apolitical initiative, NGO Servare et Manere, as the bearer of this idea, condemned the 2022 Russian invasion of Ukraine. The organization categorically condemned the evils and injustices and gross violations of international law and the principles of the UN Charter. Through the Tree of Peace program, Servare et Manere also contributes to the fulfillment of the sustainable development goals of the 2030 Agenda in Slovakia and in the partner countries.

Covid-19 Tree of peace 

The COVID-19 Tree of Peace is the world's first planted tree dedicated to the victims of the COVID-19 pandemic. The tree is a part of a global and international project, International Tree of Peace.

History 
The International Tree of Peace (Slovak: Strom pokoja, Russian: Дерево мира, German: Der Friedensbaum) is an international project that originated in Slovakia. The project, created on the occasion of the 100th Anniversary of the end of World War I, was initiated by landscape architect Marek Sobola from Žilina, Slovakia. The main goal of the project is to promote a message of peace by planting the "Tree of Peace" on every continent. This international project “Tree of Peace” officially represents the Slovak Republic under the brand called “GOOD IDEA SLOVAKIA – IDEAS FROM SLOVAKIA”. The Trademark License is granted by the Ministry of Foreign and European Affairs of the Slovak Republic. Until 2020, 15 Peace Trees have been planted in important places regarding military and world history.

2020 tree planting 
The COVID-19 pandemic resulted in global travel and other restrictions, which also affected the Tree of Peace international project. In 2020, a significant milestone was the planting of the first COVID-19 Tree of Peace in Vysoká nad Kysucou village in Slovakia.

Planting sites

2022 
Italy

 The Tree of Peace was planted at the Memorial of Austro-Hungarian Soldiers in Follina with the support of the Embassy of the Slovak Republic in Rome.

Slovakia

 The jubilee 30th Tree of Peace was planted during the celebration of the 4th anniversary of the Tree of Peace in Žilina. Event was attended by ambassadors, diplomats and guests from Brazil, Dominican Republic, Israel, Japan, Canada, Austria, Romania, Slovenia, Switzerland, Vatican City State and Slovakia. Speakers from Tonga, Tuvalu, Russia, the United Kingdom and Fiji addressed the participants.

Romania

 The memorial tree was planted on the occasion of the International Day of Peace in the Carol I Park in Bucharest.

India

 Rajasthan state, Jodhpur. A Tree of Peace was planted in the area of Mehrangarh Fort by His Highness Maharaja Gaj Singh II of Marwar-Jodhpur and his wife, together with Servare et Manere Secretary-General, Slovak Ambassador to India and other guests.
French Polynesia

 The 27th Tree of Peace in the order was planted on June 29, 2022, in Papeete by Edouard Fritch, President of French Polynesia and Dr. Marek Sobola, Secretary-General of Servare et Manere.

Australia

 The tree was planted on June 24, 2022, in the campus ground of Saint Ignatius’ College Riverview, Sydney. Planting in Australia was exceptional for the implementation of the project, as another continent was added to the portfolio.

New Zealand

 The Tree of Peace was planted on June 19, 2022, by Māori King, His Majesty Tūheitia Potatau Te Wherowhero VII.

Fiji

 Two Trees of Peace were planted in this country. One at Thurston Gardens in Suva and the other at the Tifajek Mud Pool and Hot Spring on Wailoko Road, Sabeto in Nadi.

Tonga

 This commemorative tree was planted “at distance” at Vava’u island. Planting ceremony was done on April 28, 2022, which was exactly the 111th Anniversary of Milan Rastislav Štefánik's scientific expedition to Tonga – in 1911 he observed a total Solar Eclipse. The main partner of Tree of Peace in Tonga was the Roman Catholic Diocese of Tonga. Servare et Manere as the organization responsible for the Tree of Peace implementation decided to provide humanitarian aid to Tonga to mitigate the consequences of an Hunga Tonga–Hunga Ha'apai eruption.

Norway

 Gausdal. The tree was planted in the area of the Aulestad Farm, which was imported directly from Slovakia. A Norway maple (Acer platanoides) was chosen as the most suitable species for these climatic conditions. The tree was grown under the Western Tatras in Slovakia. Aulestad is known as the former residence of Karoline and Bjørnstjern Bjørnson.

2021 
Russia

 Nizhny Novgorod. The tree was planted on the occasion of the 100th anniversary of Alexander Dubček's birth. Among other personalities, Ivan Korčok, Minister of Foreign and European Affairs of the Slovak Republic and Doctor Pavol Dubček, son of Alexander Dubček also co-planted a Tree of Peace.

Slovakia

 Zvolen. Planting the Tree of Peace in the Military cemetery in Zvolen was part of a series of memorial events to mark the Centenary of the birth of King Michael I of Romania in Slovakia organized under the auspices of the Romanian royal family. The Slovak Armed Forces together with the Romanian Armed Forces and the Slovak Ministry of Defence collaborated on this event. The tree was co-planted also by Prince Radu of Romania.
 Veľký Meder, Serbian WW1 Military Cemetery. The Tree of Peace planting event had an official name: “Centenary of the Death of King Petar I Karađorđević of Serbia”. The planting took place under the Royal Patronage of His Royal Highness Alexander, Crown Prince of Yugoslavia.
 Žilina town, Jewish Cemetery. Tree of Peace, this time dedicated to the Victims of the Holocaust (Hebrew: פרוייקט בינלאומי עץ החיים לזכרם של קורבנות השואה).

Uzbekistan

 Tashkent. The 16th Tree was planted in the capital's Victory Park on 15 March 2021, as the first foreign tree planted at the site, which is a National Monument.

2020 
Liechtenstein

 Schaan municipality. A Tree was planted at the garden of headquarters of International Commission for the Protection of the Alps. Species of tree: Tilia platyphyllos.

Slovakia

 Vysoká nad Kysucou village near Čadca. A Tree was planted in the area of the Roman Catholic Church of Saint Matthew the Apostle in Vysoká nad Kysucou. Species of tree: Quercus robur ‘Jan Zamoyski’. This tree has also a special name that reflects the 2020 global situation: “COVID-19 Tree of Peace.”

2019 
United Kingdom

 Brookwood Military Cemetery, a Private part of Czechoslovak Veterans. The President of Slovakia Zuzana Čaputová, together with the Minister of Defence Peter Gajdoš and participating diplomats, planted the 13th Tree of Peace with Marek Sobola, the author of the project. Species of tree: Tilia cordata ‘Greenspire’.

Slovakia

 Divina village near Žilina. Planting was attended by US Army officers. Species of tree: Quercus robur ‘Hentzei’.

Germany

 Leipzig. Tree was planted in The Monument to the Battle of the Nations (German: Völkerschlachtdenkmal). Planting a tree in Germany was supported by Dr. Albrecht Tintelnot, the Honorary Consul of the Slovak Republic for the Federal States of Saxony and Thuringia. Species of tree: Tilia euchlora.

Serbia

 Kragujevac. The tenth memorial tree was planted in Šumarice Memorial Park (Serbian: Spomen-park „Kragujevački oktobar", Спомен-парк „Крагујевачки октобар") on Monday, October 21, 2019. A tree was planted personally by Slavica Đukić Dejanović current Minister without portfolio in the Government of Serbia, Dagmar Repčeková, Ambassador of the Slovak Republic to Serbia and Marek Sobola. Species of tree: Thuja occidentalis 'Smaragd'.

United States

 National World War I Museum and Memorial in Kansas City. The planting of ninth “Tree of Peace” was carried out under auspices of the Honorary Consulate of the Slovak Republic to the Midwest USA and the Consulate General of the Slovak Republic in New York. The tree was planted on the North Lawn of the National WWI Museum and Memorial on June 21, 2019. Species of tree: Quercus rubra. Official Congressional Record of the proceedings and debates of the United States Congress, published in Washington, June 20, 2019, Vol. 165, No. 104.

2018 
Slovakia

 Veľkrop, in Slovakia's largest WWI War Cemetery. 8662 soldiers of the Austro-Hungarian and Russian armies are buried there. This Tree of Peace was planted on Friday, September 28, 2018. Species of tree: Quercus robur, 'Concordia' cultivar.
Vychylovka part of Nová Bystrica village. A tree was planted in Kysuce Village Museum personally by the president of the Žilina Region, Erika Jurinová on Sunday, October 28, 2018. This planting was with a participation of Žilina region. Species of tree: Quercus robur, 'Concordia' cultivar.
Žilina, Military cemetery in Bôrik. Species of tree: Quercus robur, 'Jan Zamoyski' cultivar.
Turzovka, town in Kysuce Region. Species of tree: Quercus robur, 'Atropurpurea' cultivar.
Lalinok, part of Divinka village, the birthplace of Ondrej Sobola. Species of tree: Quercus robur, 'Jan Zamoyski' cultivar.

Russia

 Pushkin, in State Museum Tsarskoye Selo in Saint Petersburg. A tree was planted on Friday, October 26, 2018. In Saint Petersburg, the tree was planted near the World War I Museum, the only museum dedicated to this theme in the Russian Federation. The planting was an international act and the project was carried out under auspices the General Consulate of the Slovak Republic in Saint Petersburg. Species of tree: Quercus robur.

Poland

 Trzyciąż, Jangrot location – The WWI Cemetery in Cieplicky Forest. Species of tree: Quercus robur, 'Atropurpurea' cultivar.

Austria

Bad Ischl. The eighth of “The Tree of Peace” that was planted by Archduke Markus Emanuel Salvator of Austria grows in the Imperial Villa (German: Die Kaiservilla) which was the summer residence of Emperor Franz Joseph I. The Imperial Villa is an important place for the history of the First World War. Emperor Franz Josef signed Austria-Hungary's ultimatum to Kingdom of Serbia at his desk in the Imperial Villa. Species of tree: Quercus rubra.

Honorary Awards 
As the umbrella organization for the Tree of Peace project, non-governmental organization Servare et Manere can recognise important personalities who treasure peace, freedom and mutual understanding and acknowledge the importance of initiatives which serve to enhance the welfare of everyone in society. Servare et Manere honour al those who have made a special contribution to the promotion of understanding between peoples and the bringing together of nations. Three awards are currently awarded:

 Tree of Peace Memorial Plaque
 Memorial Medal of Tree of Peace
 Friend of Peace

Related projects

Postal products 
The Slovak Post issued official commemorative postmarks related to Tree of Peace:

 2021: Postmark Nr. PPP 40/21 on the occasion of the planting a Tree of Peace dedicated to the Centenary of the Death of King Petar I Karađorđević of Serbia: "Petar I Karađorđević – Srbský kráľ"
 2021: Postmark Nr. PPP 27/21 on the occasion of the planting a Tree of Peace dedicated to the Victims of the Holocaust in Žilina: "Výsadba stromu pokoja"
 2018: Postmark Nr. PPP 81/18 on the occasion of The 100th Anniversary of the First World War: “Pamätník obetiam 1. svetovej vojny v Lalinku / Memorial dedicated to WWI victims from Lalinok village”
 2018: Postmark Nr. PPP 73/18 on the occasion of The 100th Anniversary of the First World War: “100. výročie ukončenia veľkej vojny”

Gallery

See also 
World Map of Peace

References 

Peace symbols
Trees
World War I
World War I memorials
War monuments and memorials